Huashi Town is an urban town in Xiangtan County, Hunan Province, People's Republic of China.

Administrative division
The town is divided into 31 villages and 1 community, the following areas: Huashi Community, Qixing Village, Qianjin Village, Hetou Village, Malong Village, Chaoshang Village, Luohan Village, Changling Village, Shuangxi Village, Jinlian Village, Qiling Village, Furong Village, Xinhua Village, Tongluo Village, Shuinan Village, Zijing Village, Zhongxin Village, Beidou Village, Tianma Village, Xinghe Village, Shiba Village, Zhaojiaying Village, Juanjiang Village, Yanbu Village, Jintang Village, Jinfeng Village, Yanfu Village, Yongren Village, Yongfeng Village, Yuanyi Village, Dongxiao Village, and Runtang Village.

History
In 1985, Huashi Township was built. In 1995, Huashi Town was built.

Geography
Yisu River is known as "Juan River"(), a tributary of the Xiang River, it flows through the town.

Huashi Reservoir, was built in August 1959, is located in the town.

Economy
Lotus seed is important to the economy.

Education
There are 10 primary schools, one Middle school and one high school located with the town.

Culture
Huaguxi is the most influence local theater.

Attractions
Hancheng Bridge was built in Qing Dynasty. Guanzheng Bridge was built in 1755.They are famous tourist attractions.

References

External links

Divisions of Xiangtan County